Chilades evorae is a butterfly species in the family Lycaenidae. It occurs on Santo Antão island in Cape Verde. The type locality is near Mesa, at 650m elevation, 5 km north of Porto Novo.

References

Butterflies described in 2011
Chilades
Butterflies of Africa
Lepidoptera of Cape Verde
Fauna of Santo Antão, Cape Verde
Porto Novo Municipality